The Austro-Hungarian Army (literally "Land Forces of Austria-Hungary"; , literally "Imperial and Royal Army") was the land force of the Austro-Hungarian Dual Monarchy from 1867 to 1918. It was composed of three parts: the joint army ("Common Army", recruited from all parts of the country), the Imperial Austrian Landwehr (recruited from Cisleithania), and the Royal Hungarian Honvéd (recruited from Transleithania).

In the wake of fighting between the Austrian Empire and the Hungarian Kingdom and the two decades of uneasy co-existence following, Hungarian soldiers served either in mixed units or were stationed away from Hungarian areas.  With the Austro-Hungarian Compromise of 1867 the new tripartite army was brought into being. It existed until the disestablishment of the Austro-Hungarian Empire following World War I in 1918.

The joint "Imperial and Royal Army" ( or k.u.k.) units were generally poorly trained and had very limited access to new equipment, because the governments of the Austrian and Hungarian parts of the empire often preferred to generously fund their own units instead of outfitting all three army branches equally. All of the Honvédség and the Landwehr regiments were composed of three battalions, while the joint army k.u.k. regiments had four.

The long-standing white infantry uniforms were replaced in the later half of the 19th century with dark blue tunics, which in turn were replaced by the pike grey M1908 uniform used in the initial stages of World War I.  In September 1915, field gray was adopted as the new official uniform colour. As the KuK Army was plagued with supply shortages, when the new Field-gray uniforms were first introduced, remaining stocks of the preexisting Pike-grey uniforms remained in use alongside the newer Feldgrau model.

The last known surviving member of the Austro-Hungarian Army was World War I veteran Franz Künstler, who died in May 2008 at the age of 107.

From the Compromise of 1867 to the World War

Planning and operations
The major decisions 1867-1895 were made by Archduke Albrecht, Duke of Teschen, who was the cousin of the Emperor Franz Joseph and his leading advisor in military affairs.  According to historians John Keegan and Andrew Wheatcroft:
 He was a firm conservative in all matters, military and civil, and took to writing pamphlets lamenting the state of the Army’s morale as well as fighting a fierce rearguard action against all forms of innovation…. Much of the Austrian failure in the First World War can be traced back to his long period of power…. His power was that of the bureaucrat, not the fighting soldier, and his thirty years of command over the peacetime Habsburg Army made it a flabby instrument of war.

In the wake of defeat in the 1866 Austro-Prussian War Austria-Hungary avoided major wars in the era between 1867 and 1914 but engaged in a number of minor military actions.  Nevertheless, the general staff maintained plans for major wars against neighboring powers, especially Italy, Serbia and Russia. By contrast, the main enemies Russia and Serbia had engaged in large scale warfare in the decade before the First World War.

In the late 19th century the army was used to suppress unrest in urban areas of the empire: in 1882 and 1887 in Vienna and notably against German nationalists at Graz and Czech nationalists in Prague in November 1897. Soldiers under the command of Conrad von Hotzendorf were also used against Italian rioters in Trieste in 1902.

The most significant action by soldiers of the Dual Monarchy in this period was the Austro-Hungarian occupation of Bosnia and Herzegovina in the summer of 1878. When troops under the command of Josip Filipović and Stjepan Jovanović entered the provinces expecting little or no resistance, they were met with ferocious opposition from elements of both Muslim and Orthodox populations there. Despite setbacks at Maglaj and Tuzla, Sarajevo was occupied in October. Austro-Hungarian casualties amounted to over 5,000 and the unexpected violence of the campaign led to recriminations between commanders and political leaders.

Size and ethnic and religious composition
In 1868, the number of active-duty troops in the army was 355,000, and the total could be expanded to 800,000 upon mobilization. However, this was significantly less than the European powers of France, the North German Confederation and Russia, each of which could field more than one million men. Though the population of the empire had risen to nearly 50 million by 1900, the size of the army was tied to ceilings established in 1889. Thus, at the start of the 20th century, Austria-Hungary conscripted only 0.29% of its population, compared to 0.47% in Germany, 0.35% in Russia and 0.75% in France. The 1889 army law was not revised until 1912, which allowed for an increase in annual conscriptions.

The ethnic make-up of the enlisted ranks reflected the diversity of the empire the army served; in 1906, out of every 1000 enlisted men, there were 267 Germans, 223 Hungarians, 135 Czechs, 85 Poles, 81 Ruthenes, 67 Croats and Serbs, 64 Romanians, 38 Slovaks, 26 Slovenes, and 14 Italians.

To aid communication between the multitude of ethnicities, the army developed a simple language called Army Slavic, based primarily on Czech.

From a religious standpoint, the Austro-Hungarian army officer corps was dominated by Roman Catholics. In 1896, out of 1000 officers, 791 were Roman Catholics, 86 Protestants, 84 Jews, 39 Greek-Orthodox, and one Uniate. Of the pre–World War military forces of the major European powers, the Austro-Hungarian army was almost alone in its regular promotion of Jews to positions of command. While the Jewish population of the lands of the Dual Monarchy 4.4% including Bosnia and Herzegovina), Jews made up nearly 18% of the reserve officer corps. There were no official barriers to military service for Jews, but in later years this tolerance eroded to some extent, as important figures such as Conrad von Hötzendorf and Archduke Franz Ferdinand sometimes expressed anti-Jewish sentiments. Franz Ferdinand was also accused (by Conrad) of discriminating against Protestant officers.

Linguistics and translations

The Austro-Hungarian Empire often suffered from a lack of military interpreters, and proved to be a major force in the partial dysfunctioning and blunders of the Austrian-Hungarian Empire. Nearly all officers of the upper ranks spoke German (specifically Austrian German), and because only a fraction of soldiers spoke German, this produced a logistical obstacle for organizing the military. Likewise the lack of mutual intelligibility between speakers of Hungarian and German led to a feeling of resentment by many non-Austrian soldiers. The delivery of orders was particularly ineffective, and the bureaucratic and dysfunctional system led to individual ethnic units becoming isolated from the overall high command.

This in turn led ethnic tensions and political violence in the empire, as such language battalions began instigating mutinies and revolts against the Austrian commanders, whom they saw as out of touch. Desertion and revolts were most common amongst Slavic battalions, particularly the Czech-Slovakian battalions, however all battalions during the war suffered from these logistical challenges. The battalions' use of languages that were not understood by the Austrian commanders also led to it being extremely difficult to impossible to discover attempts at desertion or revolt.

Funding and equipment

Following the 1867 constitutional arrangements, the Reichsrat was dominated by German Liberals, who generally regarded the army as a relic of feudalism. In Budapest, legislators were reluctant to authorize funds for the joint army but were generous with the Hungarian branch of the army, the Honvédség. In 1867 the military budget accounted for about 25% of all government spending, but the economic crash of 1873 hit Austria-Hungary hard and foreign observers questioned whether the Dual Monarchy could manage a major war without subsidies. Despite increases throughout the 1850s and 1860s, in the latter half of the century Austria-Hungary was still spending less on its army than were other major European powers. While the budget continued to rise—from 262 million crowns in 1895 to 306 million in 1906—this was still far less per capita than for other major European states, including Italy, and about on par with Russia, which had a much larger population. Further contributing to the monarchy's military weakness was the low rate of conscription: Austria-Hungary conscripted only 0.29% of its population annually, compared to 0.47% in Germany and 0.75% in France. Attempts to increase the yearly intake of recruits were proposed but repeatedly blocked by officials in Budapest until an agreement was reached in 1912.

In the emerging field of military aviation, Austria-Hungary lagged behind other European states. While balloon detachments had been established in 1893, they were mostly assigned to the fortress artillery, except for a brief period from 1909 to 1911 when they were under command of the multifaceted Verkehrs Brigade. Realization that heavier-than-air machines were necessary or useful came late, and Austria-Hungary acquired only five airplanes by 1911. In 1914 the budget for military aviation was approximately th the amount spent by France. Austria-Hungary entered the war with only 48 first-line aircraft.

Command Structure 
Austria-Hungary had a complex military structure. The country had three main distinct ground forces. As a union the Monarchy had a common government of three ministers (Minister of the Imperial Household and Foreign Affairs; Minister of War and Minister of Finance). The Imperial Minister of War had authority over the Common Army and the Navy.

The Common Army was the premier land force. It was the best equipped and had the main role to secure the borders of the Monarchy. In case of war it was to absorb the Austrian Landwehr and the Hungarian Honvéd within its command structure. For that reason the Common Army was organised in army corps even in peacetime, while the Landwehr and Honvéd were organised in territorial districts. The provinces of Bosnia and Herzegovina were governed as a condominium between the Austrian and the Hungarian parts of the dual monarchy. As such the local troops of Bosnian Riflemen were subordinated through the Governor of Bosnia and Herzegovina to the Imperial Minister of War. The general peacetime order of battle of the Common Army included:

 General Staff (Vienna)
 I. Army Corps (Kraków)
 II. Army Corps (Vienna)
 III. Army Corps (Graz)
 IV. Army Corps (Budapest)
 V. Army Corps (Pozsony)
 VI. Army Corps (Kassa)
 VII. Army Corps (Temesvár)
 VIII. Army Corps (Prague)
 IX. Army Corps (Leitmeritz)
 X. Army Corps (Przemyśl)
 XI. Army Corps (Lemberg)
 XII. Army Corps (Nagyszeben)
 XIII. Army Corps (Zagreb)
 XIV. Army Corps (Innsbruck)
 XV. Army Corps (Sarajevo) and
 XVI. Army Corps (Mostar)

The Austrian part of the monarchy (officially called Kingdoms and Lands Represented in the Imperial Council, unofficially and for short Cisleithania) had its own government. It included the Imperial and Royal Ministry of National Defence (completely independent from the Imperial War Ministry). In peacetime it had complete authority and responsibility for the Imperial-Royal Landwehr and its:

 Landwehr High Command (Vienna)
 Landwehr Garrison Command in Vienna
 Landwehr Command in Vienna
 Landwehr Command in Graz
 Landwehr Command in Prague
 Landwehr Command in Leitmeritz
 Landwehr Command in Kraków
 Landwehr Command in Przemyśl
 Landwehr Command in Lemberg
 Landwehr Command in Ragusa
 Landwehr Defence Command in Innsbruck
 Higher Authority for National Defence in Tyrol and Vorarlberg (command of higher status and autonomy)

The Hungarian part of the monarchy (officially called Lands of the Crown of Saint Stephen, unofficially and for short Transleithania) also had its own government. One of its ministries was the Royal Hungarian Honvéd Ministry (also completely independent from the Imperial War Ministry). In peacetime it had complete authority and responsibility for the:

 Honvéd High Command (Budapest)
 Royal Hungarian I. Budapest Honvéd District Command
 Royal Hungarian II. Szeged Honvéd District Command
 Royal Hungarian III. Kassa Honvéd District Command
 Royal Hungarian IV. Pozsony Honvéd District Command
 Royal Hungarian V. Kolozsvár Honvéd District Command
 Royal Hungarian VI. Zagreb Croat-Slavonian District Command (the Kingdom of Croatia-Slavonia was in personal union with Hungary, including a local Croat-Slavonian Homeguard (Landwehr in German), incorporated into the Honvéd as its sixth territorial district)

Austro-Hungarian Army in July 1914

 36,000 Officers
 414,000 NCOs and troops
 120,000 horses (estimate)
 1,200 artillery pieces

Official designations were as follows:

 regiments of the common army were designated Imperial and Royal (German: "kaiserlich und königlich" (k.u.k.); Hungarian: "Császári és Királyi"), in which Imperial stands for the Kaiser of Austria, who was also King of Hungary.
 Austrian Landwehr regiments were Imperial-Royal (German: kaiserlich-königlich (k.k.), in which Imperial stands for the Kaiser of Austria, who was also King of Bohemia in the Austrian part of the dual monarchy (kaiserlich österreichisch/königlich böhmisch)); Hungarian: császári/királyi)
 Hungarian Honvéd regiments were called Royal Hungarian for the Kaiser's title of Apostolic King of Hungary (German: königlich ungarisch; Hungarian: Magyar Királyi). Within the Hungarian part of Austria-Hungary the monarch was also King of Croatia-Slavonia, this was however not included in the titles of the Honvéd's units.
After war was declared, 3.35 million men (including the first call-up of the reserves and the 1914 recruits) gathered for action.

The Austro-Hungarian Imperial Army was officially under the control of the Commander-in-Chief, Emperor Franz Josef. By 1914, however, Franz Josef was 84 years old and the chief of staff, Count Franz Conrad von Hötzendorf, effectively had more power over the armed forces. Conrad favored an aggressive foreign policy and advocated the use of military action to solve Austria-Hungary's territorial disputes with Italy and Serbia.

Archduke Friedrich, Duke of Teschen was appointed Supreme Commander of the Austro-Hungarian army by Franz Joseph on July 11, 1914. It was thought he would not interfere with the operational and tactical plans of Conrad von Hötzendorf. Friedrich remained Supreme Commander until February 1917, when Emperor Charles I decided to assume the office himself.

Common Army 

The Common Army (k.u.k.—kaiserlich und königlich) consisted of:
 16 corps
 49 infantry divisions: 76 infantry brigades, 14 mountain brigades
 22 cavalry divisions: 44 cavalry brigades
 102 infantry regiments (each of four battalions), including 4 Bosnian-Herzegovinian (Bosnisch-Hercegowinische) infantry regiments (each of four battalions)
 4 Imperial Tyrolian rifle regiments (Tiroler Kaiserjäger) (each of four battalions)
 32 rifle battalions (Feldjäger), including 1 Bosnian-Herzegovinian rifle battalion (Bosnisch-Hercegowinisches Feldjäger Bataillon)
 42 field artillery regiments (Feldkanonen-Regimenter), including 14 field howitzer regiments (Feldhaubitz-Regimenter)
 15 mounted artillery battalions (originally named Reitende Artillerie Division), 14 heavy howitzer battalions (originally  named schwere Haubitz-Division)
 11 mountain artillery regiments (Gebirgsartillerie Regimenter)
 6 fortress artillery regiments (Festungsartillerie Regimenter): 8 independent fortress artillery battalions (selbst. Festungsartillerie Bataillone)
 15 regiments of dragoons (Dragoner), 16 regiments of hussars (Husaren), 11 regiments of lancers (Ulanen)
 16 transport battalions (railway)
 23 engineer battalions (Sappeure/Pioniere), 1 bridge construction battalion (Brücken Bataillon), 1 railway regiment (Eisenbahn-Regiment), 1 telegraph regiment (Telegraphen-Regiment)

Imperial-Royal Landwehr 

The Imperial-Royal Landwehr (k.k. or kaiserlich österreichisch/königlich böhmisch) was the standing army of Austria responsible for the defence of Austria itself.

 35 Landwehr infantry regiments: each of 3 battalions (Landwehr Infanterie-Regimenter)
 6 Landwehr regiments of lancers (uhlans)
 8 Landwehr field artillery battalions (Feldkanonen), 8 Landwehr field howitzer battalions (Feldhaubitz)

The mountain infantry had the following units:

 2 Landwehr mountain infantry regiments (Gebirgsinfanterie-Regimenter), the 4th and 27th
 3 Tyrolean rifle regiments (Tiroler Landesschützen Regimenter)—from January 1917 named "imperial rifles" (Kaiserschützen)
 1 mounted Tyrolean rifle battalion (Reitende Tiroler Landesschützen)
 1 mounted Dalmatian rifle battalion (Reitende Dalmatiner Landesschützen)

Royal Hungarian Landwehr 
 

The Royal Hungarian Landwehr (königlich ungarische Landwehr) or Royal Hungarian Honvéd (k.u. Honvéd) was the standing army of Hungary. A part of the Honvéd was the Royal Croatian Landwehr (Kraljevsko hrvatsko domobranstvo), which consisted of 1 infantry division (out of 7 in Honvéd) and 1 cavalry regiment (out of 10 in the Honvéd).

 6 Landwehr districts (honvéd katonai kerület)
 2 infantry divisions (honvéd gyalogos hadosztály)
 9 cavalry divisions (honvéd lovassági hadosztály)
 4 infantry brigades (honvéd gyalogosdandár)
 12 independent infantry brigades (honvéd önálló gyalogdandár)
 18 cavalry brigades (honvéd lovasdandár)
 32 infantry regiments (honvéd gyalogezred)
 10 regiments of hussars (honvéd huszárezred)
 8 field artillery regiments (honvéd tábori tüzérezred)
 2 horse artillery battalion (honvéd lóvontatású tüzérosztály)

The infantry regiments of the k.u.k. army had four battalions each; the infantry regiments of the k.k. and k.u. Landwehr had three battalions each, except the 3rd Regiment of the "Tiroler Landesschützen" (Tyrolian fusiliers), that had also four battalions.

In 1915 units that had nicknames or names of honour lost them by order of the War Ministry. Thereafter units were designated only by number. For instance, the k.u.k. Infanterie-Regiment (Hoch und Deutschmeister) Nr. 4 became Infanterie-Regiment No. 4 (4th Infantry Regiment).

Landsturm
The Landsturm consisted of men aged 34 to 55 who belonged to the Austria k.k. Landsturm and the Hungarian k.u. Landsturm. The Landsturm formed 40 regiments totaling 136 battalions in Austria and 32 regiments totaling 97 battalions in Hungary. The Landsturm was a reserve force intended to provide replacements for the first line units. However, the Landsturm provided 20 brigades who took to the field with the rest of the army.

Standschützen

The Standschützen (singular: Standschütze) were originally rifle guilds and rifle companies that had been formed in the 15th and 16th centuries, and were involved time and again in military operations within the borders of the Austrian County of Tyrol. A Standschütze was a member of a Schützenstand ("shooting club"), into which he was enrolled, which automatically committed him to the voluntary, military protection of the state of Tyrol (and Vorarlberg). In effect they were a type of Tyrolean local militia or home guard.

Ranks and rank insignia

Commissioned officer ranks
The rank insignia of commissioned officers.

Other ranks
The rank insignia of non-commissioned officers and enlisted personnel.

Types of uniforms

See also
 Orders, decorations, and medals of Austria-Hungary
 Army Slavic
 Grenz infantry
 1st Army (Austria-Hungary) in World War I
 Schutzkorps
 Imperial and Royal Army during the Napoleonic Wars
 List of Austro-Hungarian colonel generals
 List of Austro-Hungarian field marshals
 Weaponry of the Austro-Hungarian Empire
 The Good Soldier Švejk

References

Further reading
 Bassett, Richard. For God and Kaiser: The Imperial Austrian Army, 1619-1918. Yale UP (2016).
 Deák, István. "The Habsburg army in the first and last days of world war I: a comparative analysis." in Bela K. Kiraly and Nandor F. Dreisziger, eds. East Central European Society in World War I (1985): 301–312.
 Stone, Norman. "Army and society in the Habsburg Monarchy, 1900-1914." Past & Present 33 (1966): 95–111. in JSTOR
 Tunstall, Graydon A. The Austro–Hungarian Army and the First World War. Cambridge UP. 2021
 Watson, Alexander. Ring of Steel. Germany and Austria–Hungary at War 1914–1918. Penguin. 2016.
 Watson, Alexander. "Managing an ‘Army of Peoples’: Identity, Command and Performance in the Habsburg Officer Corps, 1914–1918." Contemporary European History 25#2 (2016): 233–251.

In German
 
 
 
 
 
 Wandruszka Adam / Urbanitsch Peter. Hrsg.(1987) Die Habsburgermonarchie 1848–1918. Bd.5.Die Bewaffnete Macht. Wien: ÖAW.

External links

 A webpage, which is devoted to Austro-Hungarian Army. Detailed information about: Organisation, biographies of the leaders, uniforms, and detailed weapon statistics, by Glenn Jewison & Jörg C. Steiner
 The Austro-Hungarian Army 1914-18, by John Dixon Nuttall (details of organization and wartime order of battle)
 Generals of Austria and Hungary, 1816-1918 
 Antique Photography & Postcards of Austro-Hungarian army 1866-1918  

 
1867 establishments in Austria-Hungary
Military units and formations disestablished in 1918
Military units and formations established in 1867